The Greater Cleveland Open was a golf tournament on the Buy.com Tour. It ran from 1990 to 2001. It was played at Quail Hollow Resort on the Devlin Course in Concord Township, Lake County, Ohio.

In 2001 the winner earned $76,500.

Winners

See also
DAP Championship, a Web.com Tour Finals event in the Cleveland suburb of Beachwood to begin in 2016
Rust-Oleum Championship, a Web.com Tour event in the Cleveland suburb of Westlake from 2013 to 2014
Legend Financial Group Classic, a Web.com Tour event from 2005 to 2007
Cleveland Open, a PGA Tour event from 1963 to 1972

Former Korn Ferry Tour events
Golf in Ohio
Sports competitions in Cleveland
Recurring sporting events established in 1990
Recurring sporting events disestablished in 2001
1990 establishments in Ohio
2001 disestablishments in Ohio